The Imperial Order of Emperor Menelik II is an Ethiopian order established in 1924 by then-Regent Tafari Makonnen, during the reign of Empress Zewditu I, in order to honor the memory of Emperor Menelik II. The Imperial Order was often referred to as the Order of the Lion, for the lion depicted in the center of the red and green cross. The honor was designed by the Parisian firm Arthus-Betrand, and is presented in five grades: Knight Grand Cross, Knight Commander, Commander, Officer and Member.

Recipients 

 Amha Selassie
 Stephen Beattie
 Noël Bowater
 Eyvind Bratt
 Alan Cunningham
 Desta Damtew
 Haile Selassie
 Charles Oluf Herlofson
 Thanat Khoman
 Lyman Lemnitzer
 Prince Makonnen
 Carl Gustaf von Rosen
 Seyoum Mengesha
 James John Skinner
 Abiye Abebe
 Sudharmono

See also 
 List of military decorations

References 

Awards established in 1924
Orders, decorations, and medals of Ethiopia
1924 establishments in Africa